Hotel Moscow is a historic three-story building in Moscow, Idaho, United States. It was built as a hotel by R. H. Barton. Construction began in 1891 on the site of a former hotel (built in 1880 and burned down in 1890), and it was completed in 1892. It was designed in the Romanesque Revival architectural style. It has been listed on the National Register of Historic Places since November 30, 1978.

References

National Register of Historic Places in Latah County, Idaho
Victorian architecture in Idaho
Romanesque Revival architecture in Idaho
Hotel buildings completed in 1891
Hotel buildings on the National Register of Historic Places in Idaho